The Girl in the Red Coat is a memoir by Polish writer Roma Ligocka (with Iris Von Finckenstein), published in November 2003 by Random House.

References

2004 novels
Polish memoirs
Random House books
21st-century Polish novels
Novels about missing people